Hey, Little One is the eighth album by American singer-guitarist Glen Campbell, released in 1968 by Capitol Records. The single "I Wanna Live" became Campbell's first number-one hit on the country charts.

Track listing
Side 1
 "Hey, Little One" (Dorsey Burnette, Barry De Vorzon) – 2:32
 "Elusive Butterfly" (Bob Lind) – 2:17
 "That's All That Matters" (Hank Cochran) – 2:29
 "Break My Mind" (John D. Loudermilk) – 2:49
 "Take Me Back" (Teddy Randazzo) – 2:38
 "I Don't Believe You (She Acts Like We Never Have Met)" (Bob Dylan) – 2:39

Side 2
 "I Wanna Live" (John D. Loudermilk) – 2:42
 "It's Over" (Roy Orbison, Bill Dees) – 2:38
 "Turn Around and Look at Me" (Jerry Capehart, Glen Campbell) – 2:50
 "Woman, Woman" (Jim Glaser, Jimmy Payne) – 3:08
 "The Impossible Dream (The Quest)" (Joe Darion, Mitch Leigh) – 2:44

Personnel
Music
 Glen Campbell – vocals, acoustic guitar
 Al Casey – acoustic guitar
 Bob Felts – drums
 Earl Palmer – drums, percussion
 Joe Osborn – bass guitar
 Doug Dillard – banjo
 Jim Gordon – drums

Production
 Al De Lory – producer, arranger, conductor
 Rick Rankin – photography

Charts
Album – Billboard (United States)

Singles – Billboard (United States)

References

Glen Campbell albums
1968 albums
Capitol Records albums
Albums recorded at Capitol Studios